National Cycle Route 75 runs from Edinburgh to Gourock via Glasgow.  It is often known as the Clyde to Forth cycle route.

It then extends via the ferry from Gourock to Dunoon onto the Cowal peninsula to Portavadie from where another ferry connects on to the Kintyre peninsula.

Route

Route 75 Map

Edinburgh to Bathgate
The route begins in Leith, Edinburgh at the north-eastern terminus of the Water of Leith until Warriston, then runs southward in Edinburgh City Centre before joining with the eastern terminus of the Union Canal at Fountainbridge.  Just after the viaduct at Slateford, the route returns to the Water of Leith until its south-western terminus at Balerno.  Thereafter it passes through Kirknewton, East Calder, Almondell and Calderwood Country Park, Mid Calder, Livingston and Bathgate.

Edinburgh | Kirknewton | Livingston | Bathgate

Bathgate to Glasgow
Between Bathgate and Airdrie the route follows alongside the newly reopened Airdrie-Bathgate railway line, passing Armadale, Blackridge and Caldercruix. Where the cycle route merges onto the A89 (Main street) [Plains] then through a short section of residential streets in Airdrie, (Craigneuk, Gartlea and Cairnhill) before proceeding into Coatdyke, the route joins a disused railway line between Airdrie and Coatbridge. The section into Coatbridge town centre is on the alignment of the former Monkland Canal. Beyond Coatbridge the route passes through Tannochside, Uddingston, Newton and Westburn to reach Cambuslang. From Cambuslang to Glasgow the route follows the Clyde walkway.

Bathgate | Airdrie | Coatbridge | Uddingston | Cambuslang | Glasgow

Glasgow to Gourock
The route runs along the north of the Clyde to the SECC, where it joins NCR 7 through Paisley to Johnstone.  It then branches west, following a disused railway track through Bridge of Weir and Kilmacolm to Port Glasgow.  After a short residential section, it rejoins the disused railway in an industrial estate, which it follows to Greenock.  It then leads to the sea front, and along to Gourock.

A  section of the route between Airdrie and Bathgate closed in October 2008 as part of a £300 million project to reopen the railway. Network Rail will build a replacement cycle path, due for completion in December 2010, although not now expected to open until May 2011.
 
Glasgow | Paisley | Kilmacolm | Greenock | Gourock

Dunoon to Portavadie
After catching the ferry from Gourock to cross the Clyde to Dunoon, the route continues on the Cowal peninsula past Loch Striven and Tighnabruaich to Portavadie from where another ferry connects on to the Kintyre peninsula

See also
Sustrans

References

Transport in Edinburgh
Transport in Glasgow
Transport in South Lanarkshire
Transport in Inverclyde